Mackay Memorial Hospital, established on 26 December 1912, is one of the largest medical centers in Taiwan. It is a private Christian hospital in Zhongshan District, Taipei, Taiwan, mostly associated with George Leslie Mackay, the first modern missionary to northern Taiwan. The hospital is deeply rooted in the Presbyterian tradition and under the spiritual guidance of the Presbyterian Church in Taiwan.

History
The original Mackay Hospital — named Mackay Clinic — was built by Mackay in Tamsui in 1880 and named to commemorate George Leslie Mackay, whose widow donated the funds. At that time, the Mackay Clinic was the first western medical institution in northern Taiwan. It was temporarily closed in 1901 at the death of Mackay.

Mackay Hospital was reopened in 1906. In 1912, it was relocated from Tamsui to Taipei and renamed Mackay Memorial Hospital. Its logo bears the date of the original foundation: 1880.

In 1967, the hospital built the first intensive care unit in Taiwan. Chang Chin-wen, a colleague of Noordhoff's, derived the term's Chinese translation. Two years later, Mackay Memorial Hospital began offering services as the first suicide prevention center in Southeast Asia. Chang, who had watched The Slender Thread, advocated for a suicide hotline as well, which became operational in July 1969. Nordhoff later sent Chang to study medical management in the United States, while Nordhoff himself returned to the US to be trained in cleft lip and palate surgery. After their return to Taiwan, Mackay Memorial Hospital built the first specialized cleft lip and palate center in Taiwan. In 1994, it established the first demonstration burn ward in Taiwan.

Notable births
 Tsai Ing-wen, President of Taiwan

See also
 Healthcare in Taiwan

References

External links

1880 establishments in Taiwan
1912 establishments in Taiwan
Hospitals established in 1880
Hospitals established in 1912
Hospitals in Taipei
Protestant hospitals